Dana A. Simmons is a retired United States Air Force Brigadier General (Special Agent) who served as the 15th Commander of the United States Air Force Office of Special Investigations (AFOSI), which is the investigative agency of the United States Air Force. He took command of AFOSI in June 2005. Prior to that, he was the Vice Commander of AFOSI from March 2004 to June 2005. In March 2010, he ceded command to BG Kevin J. Jacobsen.

Education
In 1977, Simmons received a Bachelor of Arts from  Texas State University. Then in 1983, he graduated from the Air Force's Squadron Officer School. Then in 1984, he attained a Master of Arts from  Webster University. Then in 1989, he graduated from the Air Command and Staff College, followed by graduation from the Air War College in 1997.

Military career

AFOSI appointment

Simmons was appointed Commander of AFOSI in June 2005, after serving as Vice Commander from March 2004. In May 2009, he also told CBS that AFOSI was actively protecting against hacker threats against the Air Force and United States.

Assignments
1977, Commissioned though the Air Force Reserve Officer Training Corps
Sept. 1977 – August 1979, Flight Commander, 100th Security Police Squadron, Beale AFB, California
August 1979 – February 1981, Operations Officer for the  3546th USAF Recruiting Squadron in  Houston, Texas.
February 1981 – March 1983, Chief of the  Standards Branch, HQ USAF Recruiting Service in Randolph AFB, Texas.
March 1983 – December 1985, Operations Officer, AFOSI Detachment 1040, in Randolph AFB, Texas
January 1986 – July 1988, Commander, AFOSI Detachment 6940, Ankara Air Station, Turkey
July 1988- June 1989, Simmons was a Student, Air Command and Staff College, Maxwell AFB, Alabama
July 1989 – September 1991, Simmons was the Chief of the  Counterintelligence Collections Management Branch, HQ AFOSI, Bolling AFB, Washington, D.C.
September 1991 – March 1994, Commander, AFOSI Detachment 214, Howard AFB, Panama
March 1994 – July 1996, Vice Commander, AFOSI 2nd Field Investigations Region, Langley AFB, Virginia
July 1996 – July  1997, Student, Air War College, Maxwell AFB, Alabama
July 1997 – July 1999, Commander, AFOSI 43rd Field Investigations Squadron, Peterson AFB, Colorado
July 1999 – May 2001, Commander, AFOSI 62nd Field Investigations Squadron, Yokota AB, Japan
May 2001 – March 2004, Commander, AFOSI 5th Field Investigations Region, Ramstein AB, Germany
March 2004 – June 2005, Vice Commander, Air Force Office of Special Investigations, Andrews AFB, Maryland
June 2005 – March 2010, Commander, Headquarters Air Force Office of Special Investigations, Andrews AFB, Maryland

Simmons retired from the Air Force on 1 April 2010.

Effective dates of promotion

Major awards and decorations
Simmons is a recipient of the following:

Air Force Office of Special Investigations Lance P. Sijan Award Recipient
2009 Outstanding Advocate for Women in Federal Law Enforcement Award

See also
 List of Commanders of the Air Force Office of Special Investigations
Colleen L. McGuire (USACIDC)

References

Notes 

Living people
United States Air Force generals
Recipients of the Legion of Merit
United States Air Force Office of Special Investigations
Texas State University alumni
Webster University alumni
Year of birth missing (living people)